In probability theory, the minimal-entropy martingale measure (MEMM) is the risk-neutral probability measure that minimises the entropy difference between the objective probability measure, and the risk-neutral measure, . In incomplete markets, this is one way of choosing a risk-neutral measure (from the infinite number available) so as to still maintain the no-arbitrage conditions.

The MEMM has the advantage that the measure  will always be equivalent to the measure  by construction. Another common choice of equivalent martingale measure is the minimal martingale measure, which minimises the variance of the equivalent martingale.

References 

 M. Frittelli, Minimal Entropy Criterion for Pricing in One Period Incomplete Markets, Working Paper. University of Brescia, Italy (1995).

Martingale theory
Game theory